Bill Glasson may refer to:
Bill Glasson (golfer) (born 1960), American golfer
Bill Glasson (politician) (1925–2012), Australian politician
Bill Glasson (surgeon) (born 1953), Australian ophthalmologist